Rooting may refer to:

 Gaining superuser access to a computer system
 Rooting (Android), attaining root access on Android devices
 Jailbreaking (iOS), overriding iOS software restrictions
 Cutting (plant), a plant propagation technique
 the rooting reflex
 the Australian slang for having sexual intercourse